Bangarada Jinke is a 1980 Indian Kannada-language film, directed by  T. S. Nagabharana and produced by B. S. Somasundar and T. S. Narasimhan under the banner of Kavitha Komal Productions. It stars Vishnuvardhan, Bharathi, Aarathi, Leelavathi, Pramila Joshai and Sundar Raj.

Anant Nag's Janma Janmada Anubandha and Vishnuvardhan's Bangarada Jinke released in the same year and both the films had reincarnation as their central theme.

Plot
It is a story of rebirth and revenge in the midst of a treasure hunt for the golden deer.

Cast
 Vishnuvardhan Charu in earlier birth and as Veeru during rebirth
 Bharathi as Bhagya
Aarathi as Asha
 Leelavathi
 Pramila Joshai
 Sundar Raj
 Lokanath
 Shivaram
 Musuri Krishnamurthy
 Umashri
 Shakti Prasad, Vijay, B. R. Jayaram, Mico Chandru, B. S. Achar, Shivajirao, Kaminidharan, Sripramila, Rekha, Master Chethan

Notes 
The song "Olume Siriya Kandu" picturised on Vishnuvardhan and Bharathi was shot at the Channarayana Durga Hill. Bangara Nayaka's Fort is Channarayana Durga, which is atop the Channarayana Hill in the vicinity of the Madhugiri Betta, near Tumkur in Karnataka.

Soundtrack

The music of the film was composed by Vijaya Bhaskar

References

External links

1980s Kannada-language films
1980 films
Films scored by Vijaya Bhaskar
Films directed by T. S. Nagabharana
Films about reincarnation